Om Parvat is a mountain located in Pithoragarh district, Uttarakhand, India Om Parvat peak elevation is  above sea level.

Sacred Status
It is considered sacred by Hindus and its snow deposition pattern resembles the sacred 'Om' (ॐ). Near Om Parvat, Parvat Lake and "Jonglingkong Lake". Jonglingkong Lake is sacred, as Lake Manasarovar, to the Hindus.

Om Parvat 
The Om Parvat and the Adi Kailash and are not one and the same, although there may be confusion in some sources.

Om Parvat can be viewed on the route to the Kailash Manasarovar Yatra from the last camp below Lipulekh Pass. Recently it is also claimed by Nepal, that the territory falls under Darchula District, Nepal , Where India claim it in Indian Uttarakhand side on Dharchula, Pithoragarh district. But it has always been the sacred mountain for Hindus among all over the world. Many trekkers to Adi Kailash often make a diversion to view Om Parvat. Om Parvat is located near Nabhi Dhang camp on Mount Kailash-Lake Manasarovar yatra route.

The Adi Kailash or Shiva Kailash is located in a different direction, near Sin La pass and near Brahma Parvat, the base camp of Adi Kailash is 17 km from the Kutti village at sacred Jolingkong Lake with a Hindu Shiva temple.

Adi Kailash Yatra Circuit 
The Adi Kailash Yatra Circuit begins by going up the Darma Valley and then going to Kuthi Yankti Valley  via the Sin La pass to join the Mount Kailash-Lake Manasarovar Tibetan pilgrimage route down the Sharda River.

See also 
 Gunji, Uttarakhand
 Om beach

References

Mountains of Nepal
Mountains of Uttarakhand
Six-thousanders of the Himalayas
Hindu practices